Carl Haber is an American physicist. He is best known for his work in audio preservation. In 2013 he was awarded a MacArthur Fellowship.

Career
Haber attended Columbia University for his B.A., M.Phil, and Ph.D. Since 1986, he has worked for the Lawrence Berkeley National Laboratory. Haber's work on the IRENE system has involved collaboration with the Smithsonian and the Library of Congress. Methods invented by Haber have been credited with restoring the earliest known recording of a human voice, as well as early recordings of Alexander Graham Bell's voice.

He was elected a Fellow of the American Physical Society in 2001

References

Year of birth missing (living people)
Living people
21st-century American physicists
Columbia College (New York) alumni
Lawrence Berkeley National Laboratory people
MacArthur Fellows
Fellows of the American Physical Society